María Prieto O'Mullony (born 3 October 1997) is a Spanish female handballer for BM Bera Bera and the Spanish national team. She has Extremadura origins on the mother's side 

She won the gold medal at the 2018 Mediterranean Games.

Awards and recognition
Trofeo Vicen Muñoz:
Winner: 2017/18

References 

Living people
1997 births
Spanish female handball players
People from Zamora, Spain
Sportspeople from the Province of Zamora
Competitors at the 2018 Mediterranean Games
Mediterranean Games gold medalists for Spain
Mediterranean Games medalists in handball